Ayam Ketawa or "laughing chicken" is a breed of chicken originating from the area of Sidenreng Rappang in South Sulawesi, Indonesia. It is one of several breeds of long-crowing chicken prized for the clarity and unusual length of their crows. The crow of Ayam Ketawa cocks has an unusual similarity to a human laugh. The breed was originally held as a status symbol of the Buginese royal family, but has entered into higher popularity in recent times since the fall of the monarchy. Today it is still seen as a symbol of courage, social status and heroism and they compete in contests for the most perfect crow, for the Governor of Sulawesi Cup.

Names

References

Chicken breeds
Chicken breeds originating in Indonesia